Alpenus wichgrafi is a moth of the family Erebidae. It was described by Watson in 1989. It is found in Sudan.

References

Endemic fauna of Sudan
Moths described in 1989
Spilosomina
Moths of Africa